Humberto Halbout Carrão Sinoti (born 28 August 1991) is a Brazilian actor.

Filmography

Television

Film

References

External links

 

1991 births
Living people
Male actors from Rio de Janeiro (city)
Brazilian male film actors
Brazilian male telenovela actors
21st-century Brazilian male actors